Nayvadius DeMun Cash (born Nayvadius DeMun Wilburn; born November 20, 1983), better known by the stage name Future, is an American rapper. Known for his mumble-styled vocals and prolific output, Future is considered a pioneer of the use of melody and auto-tune in modern trap music. Due to the sustained contemporary popularity of his musical style, he is commonly regarded as one of the most influential rappers of his generation.

Born and raised in Atlanta, Georgia, Future signed a recording contract with A1 Recordings and Epic Records in 2011, and released the albums Pluto (2012) and Honest (2014), which contained the platinum singles "Turn On the Lights", "Honest", "Move That Dope" (featuring Pharrell Williams and Pusha T), and "I Won" (featuring Kanye West). He then achieved critical and commercial success with DS2 (2015) and its singles "Fuck Up Some Commas" and "Where Ya At" (featuring Drake), and followed it up with Evol (2016) and its lead single "Low Life" (featuring The Weeknd). Future's eponymous fifth album and its successor Hndrxx (both 2017) made him the first artist in history to debut two albums in consecutive weeks atop the US Billboard 200; the former contained the international hits "Used to This" (featuring Drake) and "Mask Off".

After departing A1, Future released the albums The Wizrd (2019) and High Off Life (2020), which featured the RIAA certified Diamond single "Life Is Good" (featuring Drake). In 2021, Future achieved his first number-one single on the Hot 100 after a record-breaking 125 entries after featuring with Young Thug on Drake's "Way 2 Sexy". The album I Never Liked You (2022) spawned his second number-one hit, "Wait for U" (featuring Drake and Tems), which also became his highest charting single as a lead artist. The song won a Grammy Award for Best Melodic Rap Performance, while its parent album received a nomination for Best Rap Album.

Future released the mixtapes Beast Mode (with Zaytoven), 56 Nights, and What a Time to Be Alive (with Drake) in 2015; the latter included the song "Jumpman". He released the full-length collaborative projects Super Slimey (2017) with Young Thug, Wrld on Drugs (2018) with Juice Wrld, and Pluto x Baby Pluto (2020) with Lil Uzi Vert. Among the best selling musicians, Future's accolades include 2 Grammy Awards.

Early life and career beginnings
Nayvadius DeMun Wilburn was born on November 20, 1983, in Atlanta, Georgia. He attended Columbia High School in Decatur.

Future began using his stage name while performing as one of the members of the musical collective The Dungeon Family, where he was nicknamed "The Future". His first cousin, record producer, and Dungeon Family member Rico Wade, encouraged him to sharpen his writing skills and pursue a career as a rapper, which could also be used to create temporary respite from street life. Future voices his praise of Wade's musical influence and instruction, calling him the "mastermind" behind his sound. He soon came under the wing of fellow Atlanta rapper Rocko, who signed Future to his label, A1 Recordings.

From 2010 to early 2011, Future released a series of mixtapes including 1000, Dirty Sprite and True Story. The latter included the single "Tony Montana", in reference to the Scarface film. During that time, Future was also partnering with rapper Gucci Mane on their collaborative album Free Bricks, and co-wrote and featured on YC's single "Racks". He gained popularity after his songs were played by DJ Esco at Magic City, a strip club in Atlanta deemed "largely responsible for launching the careers of artists."

Career

2011–2014: Pluto and Honest

Future signed a major label recording contract with Epic Records in September 2011, days before the release of his next mixtape, Streetz Calling. The mixtape was described by XXL magazine as ranging from "simple and soundly executed boasts" to "futuristic drinking and drugging jams" to "tales of the grind". A Pitchfork review remarked that on the mixtape Future comes "as close as anyone to perfecting this thread of ringtone pop, where singing and rapping are practically the same thing, and conversing 100% through Auto-Tune doesn't mean you still can't talk about how you used to sell drugs. It would almost feel antiquated if Future weren't amassing hits, or if he weren't bringing some subtle new dimensions to the micro-genre."

Though Future had told MTV that Streetz Calling would be his final mixtape prior to the release of his debut studio album, another mixtape, Astronaut Status, was released in January 2012. In December 2011, Future was featured on the cover of Issue #77 of The FADER. Before his album being released in April 2012. XXL'''s Troy Mathews wrote, "While Astronaut Status is up and down and never really hits the highs like 'Racks', 'Tony Montana', and 'Magic' that fans have come to expect from Future, it's apparent that he's poised to continue the buzz of 2011 humming right along into 2012." Future was selected to the annual XXL Freshmen list in early 2012. His debut album Pluto, originally planned for January, was eventually released on April 17. It includes remixes of "Tony Montana" featuring Drake and "Magic" featuring T.I.. According to Future, "'Magic' was the first record T.I. jumped on when he came outta jail. Like, he was out of jail a day and he jumped straight on the 'Magic' record without me even knowing about it." The track became Future's first single to enter the Billboard Hot 100 chart. Other collaborators on the album include Trae tha Truth, R. Kelly and Snoop Dogg. On October 8, 2012, Pusha T released "Pain" featuring Future, the first single off My Name Is My Name which would be released in 2013.

It was announced that Future would be repackaging his debut album Pluto on November 27, 2012, under the name Pluto 3D, featuring 3 new songs and 2 remix songs, including the remix for "Same Damn Time" featuring Diddy and Ludacris, as well as his single "Neva End (Remix)" featuring Kelly Rowland. In 2012, Future wrote, produced and was featured on "Loveeeeeee Song", taken from Barbadian singer Rihanna's seventh studio album, Unapologetic.

On January 15, 2013, Future released the compilation mixtape F.B.G.: The Movie which features the artists signed to his Freebandz label: Young Scooter, Slice9, Casino, Mexico Rann and Maceo. It was certified platinum for having over 250,000 downloads on popular mixtape site DatPiff.

Future said of his second studio album Future Hendrix it will be a more substantive musical affair than his debut album and features R&B music along with his usual "street bangers". The album was to be released in 2013. The album features Kanye West, Rihanna, Ciara, Drake, Kelly Rowland, Jeremih, Diplo,  and André 3000, among others.

The album's lead single, "Karate Chop" featuring Casino, premiered on January 25, 2013, and was sent to urban radio on January 29, 2013. The song, produced by fellow Atlanta based producer Metro Boomin, spawned an official remix featuring Lil Wayne, was sent radio and was released on iTunes on February 19, 2013. On August 7, 2013, Future changed the title of his second album from Future Hendrix to Honest and announced that it would be released on November 26, 2013. It was later revealed that the album would be pushed back to April 22, 2014, as it was said that Future has tour dates with Drake on Would You Like A Tour?. In December 2013, it was announced that Future would make a guest appearance on Kat Dahlia's upcoming debut, My Garden. Future released DS2 on July 16, 2015.

2015–2017: DS2, Evol and commercial mixtapes

On September 20, 2015, Future released a collaborative mixtape with Canadian rapper Drake, titled What a Time to Be Alive. The album debuted at number one on the Billboard 200, Billboard R&B Charts, and Billboard Hot Rap Songs, marking the first time a rapper was able to score two number one albums in a year, in 11 years, since Jay Z back in 2004. The mixtape has sold over 334,000 copies in the U.S. On January 17, 2016, Future released another mixtape, titled Purple Reign, with executive production from Metro Boomin and DJ Esco, as well as beat credits from Southside, Zaytoven and more. On February 5, 2016, Future premiered his fourth studio album, EVOL, on DJ Khaled's debut episode of the Beats 1 radio show We The Best. In 2016, Future became the fastest artist to chart three number-one albums on the Billboard 200 since Glee soundtrack albums in 2010.

On June 29, 2016, he appeared in an issue of Rolling Stone.

2017–2018: Further releases and critical success 

On Valentine's Day 2017, Future announced via Instagram that his self-titled fifth studio album would be released on February 17, 2017. Exactly one week later, he would release his sixth studio album titled Hndrxx. Both albums went number one consecutively, which made Future the first artist to debut two albums at number one at the same time on the Billboard 200 and Canadian Albums Chart. On October 20, 2017 he alongside Young Thug would drop their collaboration mixtape Called Super Slimey. He, along with Ed Sheeran, collaborated with singer-songwriter Taylor Swift on the song "End Game" from her album Reputation. The song peaked at number 18 on the Billboard Hot 100 and was Future's eighth top 20 hit.

On January 11, 2018, Future collaborated alongside Kendrick Lamar, James Blake and Jay Rock for the song, "King's Dead", from the soundtrack album of the Marvel Studios superhero film Black Panther and Jay Rock's third studio album Redemption. At the 61st Annual Grammy Awards, the song earned two Grammy nominations, for Best Rap Performance and Best Rap Song, marking Future's first career Grammy nominations.

Future curated the soundtrack for the movie Superfly, which was released in June 2018.

On October 19, 2018, Future released Wrld On Drugs, a collaborative mixtape with fellow American rapper Juice Wrld. Wrld on Drugs debuted at number two on the US Billboard 200 behind A Star Is Born by Lady Gaga and Bradley Cooper, with 98,000 album-equivalent units, which included 8,000 pure album sales. It became Future's tenth top-ten album in the United States, and Juice Wrld's second.

2019–2021: The Wizrd, High Off Life, Pluto x Baby Pluto 

On January 18, 2019, Future released his seventh studio album, Future Hndrxx Presents: The Wizrd. The album consists of 20 songs and was promoted by a film titled The Wizrd, released on January 11 on Apple Music. The Wizrd received generally positive reviews from critics and became Future's sixth US number-one album, debuting at number one on the US Billboard 200 with 125,000 album-equivalent units (including 15,000 pure album sales). With the release of The Wizrd, several songs from the album charted on the Billboard Hot 100, leading to Future becoming the artist with the 10th most entries in Hot 100 history.

At the 61st Annual Grammy Awards held on February 10, 2019, Future won his first Grammy Award for Best Rap Performance for his collaboration alongside Jay Rock, Kendrick Lamar and James Blake for the song, "King's Dead", from the soundtrack album of the Marvel Studios superhero film Black Panther.On June 7, 2019, Future released his second project of the year, his debut solo EP titled Save Me. Save Me received mixed reviews from music critics and debuted at number 5 on the US Billboard 200.

In January 2020, Future released the songs "Life Is Good" and "Desires", both collaborations with Drake. In April, Future announced his eighth studio album, Life Is Good. The title was later changed to High Off Life and was released on May 15, 2020. The album debuted at number one on the US Billboard 200 chart, with 153,000 units in its first week, becoming Future's seventh consecutive album to debut at number one. In August 2020, Future teased a song, "Gucci Bucket Hat". It was released as a single with Pap Chanel, featuring Herion Young, on October 20, 2020.

On November 13, 2020, Future released Pluto x Baby Pluto, a collaborative studio album with Lil Uzi Vert, which was his second project of that year. It debuted and peaked at number two on the US Billboard 200. Future broke the record for most Billboard Hot 100 entries (125) until a number one single after featuring on Drake's 2021 single "Way 2 Sexy". 

2021–present: I Never Liked You

In April 2022, Future was named one of the "best rappers alive" by GQ. On April 29, 2022, Future released his ninth studio album I Never Liked You, after it was previously announced earlier that month.

Musical style
Future's music has been characterized as trap music. Future makes prevalent use of Auto-Tune in his songs, both rapping and singing with the effect. In 2013, Pitchfork wrote that Future "miraculously shows that it's still possible for Auto-Tune to be an interesting artistic tool", stating that he "finds a multitude of ways for the software to accentuate and color emotion". The LA Times wrote in 2016 that "Future's highly processed vocals suggest a man driven to bleary desperation by drugs or love or technology", stating that his music "comes closest to conjuring the numbing overstimulation of our time". GQ stated in 2014 that he "has managed to reboot the tired auto-tune sound and mash it into something entirely new", writing that he "combines it with a bizarro croon to synthesize how he feels, then [...] stretches and deteriorates his words until they're less like words, more like raw energy and reactive emotions". Critic Simon Reynolds wrote in 2018 that "he's reinvented blues for the 21st century."

American rapper T-Pain, who also uses that audio processor, criticized Future's unconventional use of it in 2014. In response, Future stated in an interview that "when I first used Auto-Tune, I never used it to sing. I wasn't using it the way T-Pain was. I used it to rap because it makes my voice sound grittier. Now everybody wants to rap in Auto-Tune. Future's not everybody."

Due to the sustained contemporary popularity of his musical style, he is commonly regarded as one of the most influential rappers of his generation.

Personal life
Future is the father of at least seven children by his account, each with different women, although another child's paternity has been litigated. He has also adopted the son of one of the mothers of his daughter. 

In October 2013, Future was engaged to Ciara, who is the mother of one of his sons, but she ended the engagement in August 2014 due to his infidelity.

In 2016, Future was sued by both Jessica Smith and Ciara. Smith sued him for failing to pay child support, stating their son "suffers from emotional and behavioral issues stemming from Future's neglect as a father". Ciara sued him for defamation, slander, and libel. In October 2016, a judge said that Future's string of tweets bashing Ciara did not relate to the $15 million she was asking for. In 2019, two women from Florida and Texas respectively filed paternity suits claiming that Future was the father of their respective daughter and son. In 2020, the Texas woman dropped her paternity suit.

Discography

Studio albums

 Pluto (2012)
 Honest (2014)	
 DS2 (2015)
 Evol (2016)
 Future (2017)
 Hndrxx (2017)
 The Wizrd (2019)
 High Off Life (2020)
 I Never Liked You (2022)

Collaborative albums
 Pluto x Baby Pluto''  (2020)

Tours
 Summer Sixteen Tour  (2016)
 Nobody Safe Tour (2016)
 Future Hndrxx Tour (2017)
 Legendary Nights Tour  (2019)
 Future and Friends: One Big Party Tour (2023)

Awards and nominations

References

External links
 
 

1983 births
Living people
21st-century American rappers
African-American male rappers
African-American male singer-songwriters
American contemporary R&B singers
American hip hop singers
Dungeon Family members
Epic Records artists
Grammy Award winners for rap music
People from DeKalb County, Georgia
Rappers from Atlanta
Southern hip hop musicians
Singer-songwriters from Georgia (U.S. state)
Trap musicians